Putt's Law and the Successful Technocrat is a book, credited to the pseudonym Archibald Putt, published in 1981. An updated edition, subtitled How to Win in the Information Age, was published by Wiley-IEEE Press in 2006.  The book is based upon a series of articles published in Research/Development Magazine in 1976 and 1977.

It proposes Putt's Law and Putt's Corollary which are principles of negative selection similar to The Dilbert principle proposed by Scott Adams in the 1990s. Putt's law is sometimes grouped together with the Peter principle, Parkinson's Law and Stephen Potter's Gamesmanship series as "P-literature".

Putt's Law
The book proposes Putt's Law and Putt's Corollary
 Putt's Law: "Technology is dominated by two types of people, those who understand what they do not manage and those who manage what they do not understand."
 Putt's Corollary: "Every technical hierarchy, in time, develops a competence inversion." with incompetence being "flushed out of the lower levels" of a technocratic hierarchy, ensuring that technically competent people remain directly in charge of the actual technology while those without technical competence move into management.

References

External links
 Archibald Putt: The Unknown Technocrat Returns (spectrum.ieee.org)

1981 non-fiction books
2006 non-fiction books
Satirical books
Politics and technology
Works published under a pseudonym
Management books